Lipocrea epeiroides is an orb-weaving spider species found in Greece, Cyprus, Turkey, Israel, Yemen and India.

See also 
 List of Araneidae species: G-M

References

External links 

Araneidae
Spiders of Europe
Spiders of Asia
Arthropods of Turkey
Invertebrates of the Arabian Peninsula
Spiders of the Indian subcontinent
Spiders described in 1872